Randyland is an art museum located in Pittsburgh, Pennsylvania. It is widely regarded as one of America's most colorful public art landmarks. Randy Gilson is the creator of this museum, which dedicates to his outsider art.

Randyland has played an important role in the cultural rejuvenation of Pittsburgh with its neighbors City of Asylum and Mattress Factory. Randyland has received international attention through viral listicles. It is among the most photographed places on Instagram.

History

Randy Gilson was born in Homestead, Pennsylvania. Early in life he suffered from homelessness and poverty. He moved to Pittsburgh's Northside in 1982, where he was a community activist planting over 800 street gardens and 50 vegetable gardens.  His guerrilla gardening spans otherwise vacant lots across Manchester, the Mexican War Streets, and surrounding neighborhoods.

The property that would become Randyland was purchased on a credit card for $10,000 in 1995. Gilson uses dumpster diving and upcycling to fill his home with colorful oddities that include pink flamingos, mannequins, and plastic dinosaurs. The houses and fences are adorned with murals depicting neighbors dancing and smiling.

In late 2016, Gilson's partner Mac McDermott was diagnosed with terminal prostate cancer. Upon hearing the news, Randyland fans raised over $20,000 and sent Randy and Mac on their first vacation. The couple visited the Grand Canyon and Hollywood. Afterwards, Gilson retired from his restaurant job to spend more time with the ailing McDermott. Following the announcement, Foo Conner joined Randyland as co-director.

The neighborhood around the museum experienced explosive growth in 2016-2019. Randyland itself reportedly doubled in attendance. The courtyard was completely overhauled to accommodate the traffic. Under Conner's curation, the facility embraced being a Selfie Museum as a vibrant backdrop for photos.

David Paul Francis "Mac" McDermott died on January 10, 2019. As Gilson's partner, he was posthumously given the title of co-founder. Journalists noted that McDermott may have downplayed his role when alive but was a backbone of the museum. Later that year, Randyland received the Mayor's Award for Public Art for 2019. Conner left the museum early 2020.

Because it is outdoors, Randyland was one of the only art museums opened in Pennsylvania during the COVID-19 pandemic. Gilson came out of retirement. The Courtyard was changed to a socially distanced playground throughout quarantine. Many of the original murals have been painted over. As of 2022, Randyland is still free and popular tourist attraction.

Exhibits

In popular culture
 The documentary The Spirit of Pittsburgh features Randy Gilson's gardening alongside Fred Rogers.
 The documentary Pursuing Happiness features Randy Gilson as one of the happiest people in America.
 When a blizzard postponed Guster's Pittsburgh concert, they instead recorded a viral music video in the alleyway near Randyland.
 Randy Gilson succeeded Rick Sebak as the Mardi Gras King of Pittsburgh.
 A teenager's "Summer Bucket List 2017", which included Randyland as a place to visit, went viral.
 Anthony Bourdain: Parts Unknown calls Randyland an essential for the "Perfect Day in Pittsburgh".

Awards
Mayor's Award for Public Art 2019

References

External links
 

Art museums and galleries in Pennsylvania
Art museums established in 1995
Houses in Pittsburgh
Modern art museums in the United States
Museums devoted to one artist
Museums in Pittsburgh
Outsider art
Visionary environments
Tourist attractions in Pittsburgh